Tara Feser (born February 2, 1980) is a Canadian wheelchair basketball player and Paralympian.

She started playing wheelchair basketball after graduating from high School in 1988 because of knee dislocation. Back in high school, she used to play regular basketball.

She has been part of Canada Women's National Wheelchair Basketball Team since 2008.

She was part of the Canadian team that came in 5th place in the women's wheelchair basketball at the 2008 Summer Paralympics.

References

External links
No. 15 - Tara Feser at Wheelchair Basketball Canada
Ask A Player - Tara Feser at Wheelchair Basketball Canada
 

1980 births
Living people
Canadian women's wheelchair basketball players
Paralympic wheelchair basketball players of Canada
Wheelchair category Paralympic competitors
Wheelchair basketball players at the 2008 Summer Paralympics